Crossandrella is a genus of flowering plants belonging to the family Acanthaceae.

Its native range is Tropical Africa.

Species:

Crossandrella adamii 
Crossandrella cristalensis 
Crossandrella dusenii

References

Acanthaceae
Acanthaceae genera